Michelle Hope Maemone (born March 18, 1997) is a former American soccer player who played as a defender for Kansas City in the National Women's Soccer League (NWSL).

Early years
Maemone was born to Joe and Anita Maemone and grew up in San Jose, California. An early enthusiast of soccer, growing up Maemone played both as a defender and forward for clubs Central Valley Arsenal and MVLA Mercury Black as well as her high school, The King's Academy.

College career
Maemone played four years for the Pepperdine Waves. During her time at Pepperdine she made 78 appearances, 69 as a starter and finished with 3 goals.  Maemone was twice named to the WCC Commissioner's Honor Roll "bronze" donors and received an All-WCC honourable mention honouree her sophomore year.

Professional career

Utah Royals, 2019-2020
Maemone was drafted by the Utah Royals FC in the third round, 23rd overall, of the 2019 NWSL College Draft.  She was signed by the Royals in April 2019.  She made her debut for the club as a starter on April 20, 2019, due to injuries to both Becca Moros and Kelley O'Hara.  The day prior to her club debut, Maemone had had 101 degree fever.

Kansas City NWSL, 2021
After the dissolution of Utah Royals FC, the NWSL awarded all of the team's player rights to the newly created Kansas City NWSL expansion team, including Maemone's. She appeared in five matches for Kansas City, starting two, before she was waived on December 21, 2021.

Career statistics 
As of May 3, 2019

References

External links
 
 
 Michelle Maemone Utah Royals FC
 

Living people
1997 births
American women's soccer players
Pepperdine Waves women's soccer players
National Women's Soccer League players
Utah Royals FC draft picks
Utah Royals FC players
Soccer players from San Jose, California
Women's association football defenders
Kansas City Current players